Thout 13 - Coptic Calendar - Thout 15

The fourteenth day of the Coptic month of Thout, the first month of the Coptic year. On a common year, this day corresponds to September 11, of the Julian Calendar, and September 24, of the Gregorian Calendar. This day falls in the Coptic season of Akhet, the season of inundation.

Commemorations

Feasts 

 Coptic New Year Period

Saints 
 The martyrdom of Saints Felix and Regula, and Saint Exuperantius 
 The departure of Saint Agathon the Stylite

References 

Days of the Coptic calendar